Makiko Hirabayashi (born 1966) is a Japanese jazz pianist based in Denmark. She started to play the piano at the age of four, and subsequently violin at nine. As a teenager, she became interested in composing film music and won a scholarship to Berklee College of Music in Boston, where she became more involved with jazz and improvisation. After graduation, she moved to Copenhagen to start her career as a pianist and composer.

Her compositions are inspired by elements from classical music, jazz, music from the Far East and the Nordic moods.

Discography 
 Makiko (Enja 2006) Makiko Hirabayashi Trio - Makiko Hirabayashi (p), Klavs Hovman (b), Marilyn Mazur (dr/perc/voc)
 Grey to Blue (Stunt 2008) Grey To Blue - Mariane Bitran (fl), Makiko Hirabayashi (p), Bob Rockwell (sax), Erik Olevik (b), Morten Lund (dr)
 Hide and Seek (Enja 2009) Makiko Hirabayashi Trio - Makiko Hirabayashi (p), Klavs Hovman (b), Marilyn Mazur (dr/perc/voc)
 Binocular (Stunt 2010) Binocular - Flemming Agerskov (tpt/flg), Makiko Hirabayashi (p), Francesco Cali (acc) 
 Surely (Enja 2013) Makiko Hirabayashi Trio - Makiko Hirabayashi (p), Klavs Hovman (b), Marilyn Mazur (dr/perc/voc) 
 Gong (Gateway 2016) Bob Rockwell (sax), Makiko Hirabayashi (p) 
 Where The Sea Breaks (Enja/Yellowbird 2018) - Jakob Buchanan (flg), Makiko Hirabayashi (p), Klavs Hovman (b), Marilyn Mazur (dr/perc/voc)
Weavers (Enja/Yellowbird 2021) - Fredrik Lundin (sax), Makiko Hirabayashi (p), Thommy Andersson (b), Bjørn Heebøll (d)

References

External links

 

Japanese jazz pianists
Japanese women pianists
Danish jazz pianists
Danish women pianists
Women jazz pianists
1966 births
Living people
21st-century pianists
21st-century Japanese women musicians
21st-century women pianists